The 1916 U.S. Open was the 22nd U.S. Open, held June 29–30 at Minikahda Club in Minneapolis, Minnesota. Amateur Chick Evans led wire-to-wire and set a new U.S. Open scoring record to win his only U.S. Open title, two strokes ahead of runner-up Jock Hutchison.

There were 94 entries and on-site qualifying was held and only the defending champion was exempt. Qualifying was held on Tuesday and Wednesday, and each day half the field played 36 holes for 32 places in the starting field of 64.

Evans opened the championship on Thursday with rounds of 70-69, the first in history to break 140 in the first two rounds of a U.S. Open. He led by three over Wilfrid Reid, who went out of contention after a 79 (+7) in the third round. Evans carded a 74 to maintain his three-shot advantage after 54 holes, with Jim Barnes as the nearest pursuer. After a double-bogey at the fourth hole, Evans recovered with a birdie at the next and matched Barnes through the front nine. At the par-5 12th, Evans found the green in two shots and two-putted for a birdie. He finished with a round of 73 to Barnes' 74. Hutchison, nine back after two rounds, moved up to second place with a 68 (−4), the lowest score to date in the final round of a U.S. Open. As the top professional, he took home the winner's share of the purse.

Evans' total of 286 established a new U.S. Open scoring record that stood for two decades, until 1936. Three months later, he won the U.S. Amateur championship at Merion near Philadelphia and became the first to win both titles in the same year. Evans won the U.S. Amateur again in 1920.

Like previous editions, this U.S. Open was scheduled for just two days, at 36 holes each. Not held in 1917 and 1918 due to World War I, it resumed in 1919 and was stretched to three days, with 18 holes on each of the first two days and 36 holes on the third. It reverted to the two-day format in 1920, then went to the three-day schedule in 1926.

Course layout

Source:

Past champions in the field 

Source:

Round summaries

First round
Thursday, June 29, 1916  (morning)

Source:

Second round
Thursday, June 29, 1916  (afternoon)

Source:

Third round
Friday, June 30, 1916  (morning)

Source:

Final round
Friday, June 30, 1916  (afternoon)

Source:
(a) denotes amateur

References

External links
USGA Championship Database
USOpen.com - 1916

U.S. Open (golf)
Golf in Minnesota
Sports competitions in Minneapolis
U.S. Open (golf)
U.S. Open (golf)
U.S. Open (golf)
June 1916 sports events
1910s in Minneapolis